The women's 4x400 metres relay at the 2010 IAAF World Indoor Championships was held at the ASPIRE Dome on 14 March.

The Jamaican team came third and was awarded the bronze medals, but was later disqualified after Bobby-Gaye Wilkins was found to have been doping. A sample of hers collected at the championships was found positive for andarine.

Medalists

Records

Schedule

Results

Final

References
 Final Results

Relay 4x400 metres
4 × 400 metres relay at the World Athletics Indoor Championships
2010 in women's athletics